NGI may refer to:

 NGI Airport or Gau Airport, an airport in Fiji
 National Geographic Institute (Belgium), the Belgian national mapping agency
 Navigazione Generale Italiana, an Italian shipping company
 Next Generation Identification, a project of the US Federal Bureau of Investigation (FBI)
 Next generation interceptor (NGI)
 Next Generation Internet (disambiguation)
 Northern Gulf Institute, a US National Oceanic and Atmospheric Administration (NOAA) Cooperative Institute
 Norwegian Geotechnical Institute, a private geoscience research and consulting foundation
 National Genetics Institute, genetics laboratory co-founded by Andrew Conrad
 Nehemiah Global Initiative, a non-governmental organization founded by Kenneth Bae

See also 
 Ngi language, a language of Cameroon